Jack Murphy (February 5, 1923 – September 24, 1980) was a sports editor and columnist for the San Diego Union newspaper from 1951–1980. Jack Murphy Stadium was named in his honor. He was affectionately referred to by fans simply as "The Murph" and "El Murph" by Spanish speakers.

Early life
Murphy was born on February 5, 1923, in Denver, Colorado. He was the older brother of New York Mets broadcaster Bob Murphy.

Career
Murphy moved from Fort Worth, Texas, in 1951 to become a sportswriter for the San Diego Union newspaper.

On December 21, 1960, Murphy wrote a column for the San Diego Union proposing the Los Angeles Chargers American Football League team become a San Diego franchise. Over the next year, through his Union articles, he would become a key figure in persuading San Diegans to relocate the Chargers. He also helped secure the Padres baseball team as a National League expansion team in 1969.

Jack Murphy Stadium

After the Chargers began to outgrow Balboa Stadium, Murphy assisted in lobbying for a new San Diego stadium in his sports articles for the San Diego Union. A 50,000-seat stadium was proposed to and approved by San Diego voters in 1965.

The eventual 54,000-seat San Diego Stadium was renamed San Diego–Jack Murphy Stadium after Murphy died in 1980. It was also known by its shortened name "The Murph". The stadium was renamed Qualcomm Stadium in 1997 and Qualcomm retained the naming rights until 2017. The stadium was renamed SDCCU Stadium in 2018 after San Diego County Credit Union purchased the naming rights. In order to continue to honor Murphy, the city named the stadium site Jack Murphy Field.

Personal life
Murphy owned a black Labrador Retriever named Abe that he would write about in his articles. A statue of Murphy with Abe is located in front of Qualcomm Stadium.

Murphy was a third cousin of billionaire investor Warren Buffett.

Murphy died on September 24, 1980, of lung cancer.

Awards
On May 3, 1988, Murphy was inducted into the National Sportscasters and Sportswriters Hall of Fame.

References

1923 births
1980 deaths
Sportswriters from California
Writers from San Diego
San Diego Padres
San Diego Chargers
American male journalists
20th-century American journalists
20th-century American non-fiction writers
20th-century American male writers
Deaths from lung cancer